The Anglican Diocese of Lokoja is one of eleven within the Anglican Province of Lokoja, itself one of 14 provinces within the Church of Nigeria. The current bishop is Emmanuel Egbunu, the Archbishop Emeritus of Lokoja.

The diocese was inaugurated on 18 October 1994, with George Bako as the pioneer Bishop.

Notes

Church of Nigeria dioceses
Dioceses of the Province of Lokoja